Maurice Walter "Morrie" Church  (4 October 1922 – 4 January 1981) was a New Zealand rugby league coach who coached New Zealand.

Family
Morrie was married to Joy Church (née Bracefield). They had six children Barry, Irene, David, Allan, Graham and Stephen.

Playing career
Church coached Miramar in the Wellington Rugby League competition and in 1970 coached the New Zealand Kiwis for three matches.

In the 1979 New Year Honours, Church was awarded the Queen's Service Medal for community service. He died in Porirua on 4 January 1981.

References

1922 births
1981 deaths
New Zealand rugby league coaches
New Zealand national rugby league team coaches